Maglód is a town in Pest County, Budapest metropolitan area, Hungary.

History
The name of Maglód was first mentioned in about 1200 by Anonymus in his narrative, according to which the grandfathers of the seventh leader of the conquest, Tétény (hu), were Gyula and Zombor, from whom the inhabitants of Maglód descend.

In the 14th century Maglód was the property of the Kátai and Bodonyi families. During the period of Ottoman Hungary and during Rákóczi's War of Independence, the village was depopulated. The town was reinstated after 1710, with its new inhabitants composed mainly of Slovakian serfs from Nógrád. In the 18th century, the Fáy (hu) and Ráday (hu) families owned the village.

On 1 July 2007 the village was given the status of town.

Notable people
Lajos Takács, mathematician

Transportation  
Maglód can be reached by bus or train.

Demographics
The ethnic composition of the population: 98% Hungarian, 1.5% Slovak, 0.5% other (Gypsy, German, Romanian) 
Religious composition of the population: Catholic 43%, Evangelical 18%, Reformed 13%, Other or Unknown 26% 
With secondary education: 33% of the population
With higher education: 7.8% (2001)

Sights 
 Petőfi statue
 Trianon monument

Twin towns – sister cities

Maglód is twinned with:
 Bene, Ukraine
 Dlhá Ves, Slovakia
 Lueta, Romania
 Mýtne Ludany, Slovakia

References

External links

  in Hungarian

Populated places in Pest County